Megan Dahle (born July 29, 1975) is an American politician serving as a member of the California State Assembly. A Republican, she represents the 1st State Assembly district, which encompasses the northeastern corner of California, including the Redwood Forest and the northern Sierra Nevada region.

Career 
Prior to being elected to the State Assembly, Dahle served on the Big Valley Joint Unified School Board. The Dahles owned a wheat farm and Megan Dahle previously owned a plant nursery in Bieber.

California State Assembly 
In 2019, her husband, Brian, won a special election for a seat in the California State Senate, leaving his State Assembly seat vacant. Dahle won a special election to fill that vacant Assembly seat, defeating Democratic candidate Elizabeth Betancourt, a farmer. She was re-elected in 2020 and 2022.

Committee Memberships 

 Education - Vice-Chair
 Water, Parks, and Wildlife - Vice-Chair
 Appropriations 
 Environmental Safety & Toxic Materials 
 Governmental Organization 
 Select Committee on California-Mexico Bi-National Affairs
 Select Committee on Coastal Protection and Access to Natural Resources
 Select Committee on Community and Law Enforcement Relations and Responsibilities
 Select Committee on Cybersecurity
 Select Committee on Ensuring Systemic Equity Post-COVID-19
 Select Committee on Food Systems
 Select Committee on the Master Plan for Higher Education in California
 Select Committee on the Nonprofit Sector
 Select Committee on Small Business and Entrepreneurship
 Select Committee on Technology and the Future of California’s Agricultural Workforce
 Special Committee on the Office of the Attorney General
 Select Committee on the Social Determinants of Health

Personal life 
Dahle and her husband have three children.

Elections

2019 (special)

2020

References

External links 
 
 Campaign website
 Megan Dahle at ballotpedia.org

Living people
Republican Party members of the California State Assembly
Women state legislators in California
1975 births
21st-century American politicians
21st-century American women politicians